Redmond High School is a public high school in Redmond, Oregon, United States.

Notable alumni 
 Les AuCoin, former U.S. congressman
 Maarty Leunen, basketball player
 Tom McCall, Oregon governor 1967–1974
 Arthur Tuck, athlete
 Jed Weaver, professional football player

References 

High schools in Deschutes County, Oregon
Buildings and structures in Redmond, Oregon
Public high schools in Oregon
1926 establishments in Oregon
Educational institutions established in 1926